Gökçeli is a village in the Adaklı District, Bingöl Province, Turkey. The village is populated by Kurds of the Zimtek tribe and had a population of 236 in 2021.

The hamlets of Aşağı Çanakçı, Kargıcak, Kilimli, Şahhüseyin and Yukarı Çanakçı are attached to the village.

References 

Villages in Adaklı District
Kurdish settlements in Bingöl Province